The 1937 Tulsa Golden Hurricane football team represented the University of Tulsa during the 1937 college football season. In their second year under head coach Vic Hurt, the Golden Hurricane compiled a 6–2–2 record and won the Missouri Valley Conference championship. The team defeated Oklahoma (19–7) and Oklahoma A&M (27–0), but lost to No. 16 TCU (20–13) and No. 14 Arkansas (28–7) and tied No. 18 Rice (0–0).

Schedule

After the season

The following Golden Hurricane players were selected in the 1937 NFL draft.

References

Tulsa
Tulsa Golden Hurricane football seasons
Missouri Valley Conference football champion seasons
Tulsa Golden Hurricane football